Clevin Finley Hannah (born November 15, 1987) is an American-Senegalese professional basketball player for Scafati Basket of the Italian Lega Basket Serie A.

Professional career
Hannah began his professional career with Perla Harghitei Miercurea Ciuc of the Liga Națională, during the 2010–11 season. In 2011, he joined Kauhajoen Karhu of the Korisliiga. In 2012, he joined ALM Évreux Basket of the LNB Pro B and in 2013 he moved to SLUC Nancy of the LNB Pro A. In 2014, he signed a one-year contract with FIATC Joventut. In 2015, he signed a two-year contract with Bilbao Basket during which he won the Liga ACB.

On July 20, 2016, Hannah signed with the Turkish club Büyükçekmece Basketbol.

On December 28, 2016, Hannah signed with Lietuvos rytas Vilnius. On May 24, 2017, it was reported that Hannah along with other American-born teammates Corey Fisher and Taylor Brown were partying and consuming alcohol in Vilnius nightclubs right after losing the Game 3 of the LKL Playoffs on May 20. All of them were denying the fact but the incontestable pictures were published, which shattered all the doubts. The semi-final game was crucial as following it the series moved to Panevėžys and were lost 1–3, resulting in second shocking fiasco during the same season for the club. On the same May 24, all three players were suspended from the team. On May 25, head coach Rimas Kurtinaitis said that it was not the first time when all three players were behaving unprofessionally and that they were ignoring previous warnings. Some witnesses noted that Taylor Brown previously was also consuming drugs.

On July 19, 2018, Hannah signed a one-year deal with Herbalife Gran Canaria of the Liga ACB and the EuroLeague.

On July 24, 2019, Hannah signed a three-year deal with MoraBanc Andorra.

On July 28, 2022, he has signed with Fuenlabrada of the Liga ACB.

On January 23, 2023, he signed with Scafati Basket of the Italian Lega Basket Serie A.

Career statistics

Domestic leagues

|-
| style="text-align:left;"| 2014–15
| style="text-align:left;"| Joventut
| 35 || 3 || 19.0 || .433 || .385 || .857 || 1.3 || 2.4 || 0.8 || .0 || 10.2 || 8.7

References

External links

Clevin Hannah at acb.com
Clevin Hannah at eurobasket.com

1987 births
Living people
ALM Évreux Basket players
American expatriate basketball people in Finland
American expatriate basketball people in France
American expatriate basketball people in Lithuania
American expatriate basketball people in Romania
American expatriate basketball people in Spain
American expatriate basketball people in Turkey
American men's basketball players
Antalya Büyükşehir Belediyesi players
Baloncesto Fuenlabrada players
Basketball players from New York (state)
BC Andorra players
American expatriate basketball people in Andorra
BC Rytas players
Bilbao Basket players
Büyükçekmece Basketbol players
CB Gran Canaria players
CB Murcia players
Chipola Indians men's basketball players
Joventut Badalona players
Kauhajoen Karhu players
Liga ACB players
Paris Dragons basketball players
Point guards
Senegalese expatriate basketball people in Spain
Senegalese men's basketball players
SLUC Nancy Basket players
Sportspeople from Rochester, New York
Wichita State Shockers men's basketball players